Happy Family is a 2002 Hong Kong romantic comedy film directed by Herman Yau and starring Nick Cheung, Candy Lo and Kenny Bee.

Plot
Small Han Sang (Nick Cheung) works in a top position at his father's (Kenny Bee) real estate company. His father does not interfere often but during a period of interviewing new applicants, his father has personally recommended Kaka (Candy Lo), who in the end, gets a job at the company. A good worker and a good bond between Sang and Kaka is created, even to the point of love and plans of marriage. However, Mr. Han later drops the bomb that Kaka is actually Sang's sister.

Cast and roles
 Nick Cheung as Sang
 Candy Lo as Kaka
 Kenny Bee as Mr. Han
 Cecilia Yip as Mrs. Han
 Amanda Lee as Kaka's mom
 Chan Man-man
 Alfred Cheung as Director Cheung
 Fennie Yuen as Psychiatrist
 Almen Wong as Pig Yik
 Tats Lau as Kei
 Wilson Yip as Police negotiator
 Matt Chow as Mr. Han's housekeeper
 Simon Lui as Kaka's dad
 Monica Lo 
 Emily Kwan (關寶慧) as TV Reporter
 Iris Chai
 Thomas Lam as Harry
 Marco Mak as Applicant for director's job
 Sherman Wong as Applicant for director's job
 Jackie Ma
 Herman Yau as Applicant for director's job
 Sharon Chan as Sabrina
 Mak Chun Hung as Guitar player at jazz club
 Leo Lo
 Ricky Fan as Bass guitar player at jazz club

External links
 IMDb entry
 HK cinemagic entry

2002 films
2002 romantic comedy films
Hong Kong romantic comedy films
2000s Cantonese-language films
Incest in film
Films directed by Herman Yau
Films set in Hong Kong
Films shot in Hong Kong
2000s Hong Kong films